is a 2018 Japanese animated short film written and directed  by Hayao Miyazaki made for the Ghibli Museum. It premiered at the museum on March 21, 2018.

The short film is shown only in the Ghibli Museum. The story is about a recently hatched caterpillar named Boro as he takes his first steps into the world.

Production 
The origin of Boro stemmed from sketches that Miyazaki had made in 1995. Miyazaki first brought up Boro as a potential idea for a movie, but Ghibli producer Toshio Suzuki, concerned about the difficulty of making a feature-length film with no human characters, proposed creating Princess Mononoke instead.

Following the release of The Wind Rises in 2013, Miyazaki announced his retirement. However, sensing that Miyazaki still wanted to work on projects, Suzuki asked the retired director if he would be interested in creating a short film using his Boro idea. In 2015, Miyazaki decided to come out of retirement to work on a roughly ten-minute short film meant to be screened exclusively at the Ghibli Museum. Miyazaki described the plot of Boro as being about "a story of a tiny, hairy caterpillar, so tiny that it may be easily squished between your fingers".

While Miyazaki had previously incorporated computer-generated images into earlier, hand-drawn films like Spirited Away, Boro was Miyazaki's first work to incorporate a CG animated main character. Suzuki had suggested Miyazaki work using CGI, as he thought that "the challenge of a new technique might get [Miyazaki] fired up again". Miyazaki himself stated that "I have ideas I may not be able to draw by hand, and [CGI] may be a way to do it—that’s my hope. It’s a new technology". Given the choice by Suzuki, Miyazaki opted to go with a team of Japanese CGI animators instead of working with Pixar under John Lasseter, as the former would be able to speak Japanese. On September 21, 2015, CG animator Yuhei Sakuragi announced that he would be helping Miyazaki complete Boro.  The production of the film was partially documented in the NHK-produced documentary Never-Ending Man: Hayao Miyazaki released in 2016.

Japanese television host and comedian Tamori provided all voices and sound effects for Kemushi no Boro. The piano song at the end of the short film was performed by longtime Ghibli collaborator Joe Hisaishi.

Release 
Toshio Suzuki initially stated that Kemushi no Boro was due for a July 2017 release. It eventually premiered at the Ghibli Museum on March 21, 2018.

References

External links
 Boro the Caterpillar on the Ghibli Museum's website
Official program details on Never-Ending Man: Hayao Miyazaki, a documentary covering the time-frame from Miyazaki's retirement to the development of Boro

2018 films
2018 anime films
2018 short films
2010s animated short films
Anime short films
Films directed by Hayao Miyazaki
2010s Japanese-language films
Studio Ghibli animated films